The Spanish Association for Standardization and Certification (AENOR) is an entity dedicated to the development of Standardization and Certification in all Spanish industrial and service sectors.

Description 

Aenor is a private, independent, non-profit-making (although they charge to access their standards) Spanish institution which contributes through standardization and certification to improve technology produced by companies.
It was created by order of the Ministry of Industry and Energy on 26 February 1986, in accordance with the Royal Decree 1614/1985 and was recognized as a standardization organization and as an entity of certification by Royal decree 2200/1995, following the law 21/1992 of industry.

Functions 

The functions of AENOR are:

 Standardization: AENOR is the organization legally responsible of development and diffusion of technical standards in Spain.
 Certification: AENOR certificates are one of the most valued in the international ambit, since it has emitted certificates in over 60 countries. Therefore, AENOR is situated between the ten most important certificatory in the world.
 Publishment Activity: It offers a wide catalog of technical books, ebooks and magazines among others.
 Software Design: AENOR designed Ceertol, which is family of computing solutions for the management of systems.
 Training in different areas:

 Quality control
 Food quality and security
 Environmental Management
 Social responsibility and sustainable development
 Energy and climate change
 Security and health at work
 Information technology
 Human resources and training.
  Information services: they provide general information about the following issues:
 UNE (Spanish: Una Norma Española; English: one spanish standard) standards and others national, european and international regulations documents.
 Systems, processes, applicable standards and AENOR certification marks, for products, services, quality systems, prevention of occupational risks, among others.
 Spanish legislation related to standardization activities.
 Commercial information on the different publications and services of AENOR.
 Information on current certifications.

History 

Coinciding with the incorporation of Spain to the European Economic Community, in 1986 AENOR was constituted. Until that date, standardization work was the responsibility of the Institute for Rationalization and Standardization (IRANOR).

First steps in standardization 

In the first year 24 technical standards committees were created. A year later, AENOR assumed the representation of Spain before the European organizations (CENELEC, ETSI) and international (ISO, IEC).

Nowadays, AENOR has more than 200 technical standards committees involving nearly 6,000 experts in the field.

Milestones

Members 
Any entity that has interest in the develop of the standardization or certification can be member of AENOR, because of its associative character. Today, It has more than 800 members, among them are the main business associations, some of the first Spanish companies and a good representation of Public Administrations.

Categories 

 Individual :Physical people
 Corporate members :business organizations and associations of customers of statal ambit.
 Members: Companies and institutions.
 Honor Members : Natural or legal persons who receive this consideration in recognition of the service of the purposes of the Association.

Governing bodies 

 All Governing Bodies are called and chaired by the President.
 The General Assembly is the supreme body in which all members participate. Its function is to elect the Board of Directors, which is responsible for the representation and management of the Association.
 The Board of Directors consists of a maximum of 70 members representing the different classes of members and the interested parties, who then elect the Permanent Commission.
 The Standing Committee is composed of 10 members and is responsible for supervising and controlling the guidelines established by the Board of Directors.

Participation in international and regional standardization bodies 
AENOR is a Spanish member of the following international standardization organizations:

 International Organization for Standardization (ISO);
 International Electrotechnical Commission (IEC).

Likewise, at European level, AENOR is a Spanish member of the following recognized standardization organizations:

 European Committee for Standardization (CEN);
 European Committee for Electrotechnical Standardization (CENELEC).

AENOR is the official Spanish national standardization organization according to (ETSI).

See also 
 Standardization
 International Organization for Standardization (ISO)
 Countries in the International Organization for Standardization
 European Committee for Standardization (CEN)
 European Committee for Electrotechnical Standardization (CENELEC)
 International Accreditation Forum (IAF)

References 

Spain
Standards organisations in Spain